This is a list of cities in South Asia thought to have been founded before the 8th century (before the rise of the Pala Empire).

In alphabetical order
Amaravati
Anga Now as Bhagalpur
Bharuch
Ayadhya Now as kanyakumari
Badayun
Banbhore (now in Pakistan)
Barbarikon (now in Pakistan)
Bayana
Bhattiprolu
Bhinmal
Bhokardan (Bhogavardhana) 
Bhubaneswar (Sisupalgarh)
Chandraketugarh
Chennai
Chunar
Chidambaram
Chirand
Coimbatore
Cuddalore
Cuttack
Debal (now in Pakistan)
Dhanyakataka
Dharmapuri
Dwarka
Erode
Garthapuri Now as Guntur / గుంటూరు
Gwalior
Hampi
Hansi
Harappa (Now in Pakistan)
Jabalpur
Jaipur
Jhansi
Junagadh
Kalibangan
Kalinjar
Kalpi
Kanchipuram
Kannauj
Karur
Kaveripoompattinam
Keezhadi
Kodumanal
Kotivarsha (Devkot)
Kumbakonam
Kumbhoj
Kurukshetra
Lothal
Lashkar
Madurai
Meluhha (now in Pakistan) 
Mohenjo-Daro (Now in Pakistan)
Mahabalipuram
Mannargudi
Mayiladuthurai
Minnagara (now in Pakistan) 
Muziris Now as Kodungallur
Nagapattinam
Nalanda
Namakkal
Nashik
Osian
Paithan
Patala (modern day's  Thatta, now in Pakistan)
Pataliputra
Pistapura
Poona (now known as pune) 
Purushapura (modern day's Peshawer, now in Pakistan )
Pushkalavati (modern day's Charsadda, now in Pakistan)
Prayag (in modern Allahabad)
Pundravardhana
Pudumadam புதுமடம்
Puri
Pushkar
Quilon(Coulão)
Rajagriha Now as Rajgir
Rajahmahendravaram
Rajapura
Ramanathapuram
Rameshwaram
Sagala (modern day's Sialkot, now in Pakistan)
Salem
Sangrur
Saketa Now as Ayodhya
Sirkap (Now in Pakistan)
Sirsukh (now in Pakistan) 
Sitanagaram
Somnath
Sopara
Sravasti
Tamralipta, now Tamluk
Taxila (earlier Takshashila, now in Pakistan)
Thanjavur (Tanjore)
Tiruchengode
Tiruchirappalli (earlier Uraiyur)
Thirussivaperoor Now as Thrissur(Trichur)
Tirunelveli
Tiruvannamalai
Tiruvarur
Udayagiri(now Bhopal)
Ujjain(earlier Ujjayini, Avanti)
Vadodara(earlier known with following names Viravati, Chandravati, Vadpatra and Baroda)
Vaishali (ancient city)
Vallabhi
Varanasi
Vellore
Vidisha
Bairat, now Viratnagar
Maisolos, Masalia, Masulipatnam, Masulipatam, now Machilipatnam or Bandar
Vijayavatika, now Vijayawada
Visakhapatnam(earlierWaltair)
Vrindavan
Vellore

External links
 Geographical Dictionary Of Ancient And Mediaeval India by Nundo Lal Dey

 
Lists of cities in India
Ancient history-related lists